Out Stealing Horses is a 2019 Norwegian drama film directed by Hans Petter Moland. It was selected to compete for the Golden Bear at the 69th Berlin International Film Festival. At Berlin, the film won the Silver Bear for Outstanding Artistic Contribution. It was selected as the Norwegian entry for the Best International Feature Film at the 92nd Academy Awards, but was not nominated.

Plot
A 67-year-old recalls the summer of 1948, the year he turned fifteen.

Cast
 Stellan Skarsgård
 Tobias Santelmann
 Danica Curcic
 Pål Sverre Hagen
 Anders Baasmo Christiansen

Production
The film was shot in rural Norway, in the municipality of Trysil, and also in Lithuania's nature parks and the cities of Kaunas and Vilnius.

See also
 List of submissions to the 92nd Academy Awards for Best International Feature Film
 List of Norwegian submissions for the Academy Award for Best International Feature Film

References

External links
 

2019 films
2019 drama films
Norwegian drama films
2010s Norwegian-language films
Films directed by Hans Petter Moland
Silver Bear for outstanding artistic contribution